155 (one hundred [and] fifty-five) is the natural number following 154 and preceding 156.

In mathematics 
155 is:
a composite number
a semiprime.
a deficient number, since 1+5+31=37<155.
odious, since its binary expansion  has a total of 5 ones in it.

There are 155 primitive permutation groups of degree 81. 

If one adds up all the primes from the least through the greatest prime factors of 155, that is, 5 and 31, the result is 155.   Only three other "small" semiprimes (10, 39, and 371) share this attribute.

In the military
  was a United States Navy Admirable-class minesweeper during World War II
  was a United States Navy Wickes-class destroyer during World War II
  was a United States Navy General G. O. Squier-class transport during World War II
  was a United States Navy Buckley-class destroyer escort during World War II
  was a United States Navy  during World War II
  was a United States Navy four-master wooden schooner during World War II
 155mm artillery, a common caliber

In sports

 The maximum possible score in a single break in snooker, with a free ball at the start of the break (147 is the highest possible without a free ball)

In transportation
 Alfa Romeo 155, a compact executive car produced from 1992 to 1998
 Seattle Bus Route 155
 London Bus Route 155
 The British Rail Class 155 is a diesel multiple unit British train
 Blériot 155 was a French airliner of the 1920s
 155th Street, Manhattan, New York
 155th Street New York City Subway stations:
 155th Street (IND Concourse Line)
 155th Street (IND Eighth Avenue Line)
 155th Street (IRT Ninth Avenue Line) (former)

In other fields
155 is also:
 The year AD 155 or 155 BC
 155 is the number for the International Operator in the United Kingdom
 155 AH is a year in the Islamic calendar that corresponds to 771 – 772 CE
 155 Scylla is a main belt asteroid
 Europium-155 is a radioisotope or Europium and fission product with a half-life of 4.76 years
 155, a 2007 song by the band +44
 The dialing code for Obihiro, Japan
 The atomic number of an element temporarily called unquintquinttium
 155 North Wacker is a 46-story skyscraper in Chicago
 Wolseley No. 155, Saskatchewan is a rural municipality in Canada

See also
 List of highways numbered 155
 United Nations Security Council Resolution 155
 United States Supreme Court cases, Volume 155
 Psalms 152–155
 McHenry County, Illinois Community High School District 155

References

External links

Integers